Protentomon pauliani is a species of proturan in the family Protentomidae. It is found in Africa and Southern Asia.

References

Protura
Articles created by Qbugbot
Animals described in 1961